HMS Algerine was a  steel screw sloop of the Royal Navy. She was launched at Devonport in 1895, saw action in China during the Boxer Rebellion, and later served on the Pacific Station. She was stripped of her crew at Esquimalt in 1914, and transferred to the Royal Canadian Navy in 1917, being commissioned as HMCS Algerine. She was sold as a salvage vessel in 1919 and wrecked in 1923.

Design
Algerine was a Phoenix-class steel screw sloop mounting 10 guns. She and her sister ship, Phoenix, were designed by Sir William White, the Admiralty Chief Constructor. The ship had length overall  and measured  between perpendiculars.

Algerine was constructed of steel and given a protective deck of  steel armour over her machinery and boilers.

Propulsion
As built the class were rigged with a barquentine sail plan (square rigged on the foremast, but fore-and-aft rigged on main and mizzen). This was removed in later years, leaving her dependent on her engines alone. However, the masts were never removed.

Algerine was provided with a three-cylinder vertical triple-expansion steam engine developing  and driving twin screws. The machinery was provided by Devonport Dockyard.

Armament
Her armament consisted primarily of six 4-inch quick-firing guns weighing a ton each and firing a  shell. In addition she was fitted with four 3-pounder guns and three machine guns. The machine guns were .45 calibre Maxim guns.

Service history

Royal Navy service
The ship was laid down at Devonport Dockyard on 25 July 1894 and launched on 6 June 1895.
Algerine was deployed to the China Station, under Commander Edmond Slade from 1898. She was recommissioned at Hong Kong on 15 February 1900 by Commander Robert Hathorn Johnston Stewart, and served in Chinese waters during the Boxer Rebellion. In June 1900 Algerine was involved in an attack on the Taku Forts by an international naval force, including contributing to a multi-national landing party, and had six men wounded. She also landed a 4-inch gun, and this was used in the capture of Tientsin. Commander Rowland Nugent was appointed in command on 1 May 1902.

Algerine served on the Pacific Station at Esquimalt and on the West Coast of the Canada. They entered Esquimalt on 15 August. Following her arrival at Esquimalt, her crew was sent to man , and the ship lay unused in harbour for most of the First World War.

Royal Canadian Navy and fate
In 1917 Algerine was lent to the Royal Canadian Navy to serve as a depot ship at Esquimalt. She was sold on 11 April 1919 for use as a salvage vessel. In her new guise she was wrecked on 13 October 1923 in the Principe Channel, British Columbia. when she ran aground on Brodie Rock. She was then towed to Victoria and sold for scrap in January 1924. (Provincial Archives). The sixth vessel to bear this name.

References

Notes

Sources

External links
  
 OldWeather.org transcription of ship's logbooks August 1914

 

Sloops of the Royal Canadian Navy
Phoenix-class sloops
Victorian-era sloops of the United Kingdom
1895 ships
Ships built in Plymouth, Devon
Auxiliary ships of the Royal Canadian Navy